David John Butler is an American speculative fiction author. His epic flintlock fantasy novel Witchy Kingdom won the Dragon Award for Best Alternate History Novel in 2020. Witchy Winter won the 2018 AML Award for Best Novel and the 2018 Whitney Award for Best Speculative Fiction, and Witchy Eye was a preliminary nominee for the Gemmell Morningstar Award.

Life and career 
Butler attended the New York University School of Law, earning his Juris Doctor in 1999. He is married to Emily Butler. He spent over a decade working as a lawyer for companies including Micron Technology before opening an independent firm in 2010. He is employed as a corporate trainer, using his skills as a storyteller to educate business people. He began pursuing his childhood dream of being an author in 2010. His steampunk Western novel, City of Saints, was a 2012 Whitney Award finalist in the speculative fiction category. He also worked as acquisitions editor for WordFire Press.

In 2017, Baen published the first of Butler's American epic flintlock fantasy series, Witchy Eye, set in an alternate 1815 America. It was a finalist for a Dragon Award in 2017 and was a preliminary nominee for a Gemmell Morningstar Award in 2018. The second book in the series, Witchy Winter, won the 2018 AML Award for Best Novel, the 2018 Whitney Award for Best Speculative Fiction, and was a finalist for the 2018 Dragon Award for Best Alternate History Novel. Witchy Kingdom won the Dragon Award for Best Alternate History Novel in 2020.

Bibliography

The Buza System
 Crecheling (February 2015, WordFire Press)
 Urbane (July 2016, WordFire Press)

City of Saints
Alternate history Civil War era featuring secret agents Samuel Clemens and Edgar Allan Poe trying to obtain the plans for airship and ray gun technology.
 Liahona (June 2012, self, ebook only, no ISBN)
 Deseret (July 2012, self, ebook only, no ISBN)
 Timpanogos (August 2012, self, ebook only, no ISBN)
 Teancum (September 2012, self, ebook only, no ISBN)

An omnibus, collecting all four novels, was also published:
 City of Saints (omnibus, November 2015, WordFire Press)

The Extraordinary Journeys of Clockwork Charlie 
A clockwork boy, Charlie Pondicherry, has various adventures. This is a middle grade series.

 The Kidnap Plot (June 2016, Knopf)
 The Giant's Seat (June 2017, Knopf)
 The Library Machine (September 2018, Knopf)

Hiram Woolley 
 The Cunning Man with Aaron Michael Ritchey (November 2019, Baen)
 The Jupiter Knife with Aaron Michael Ritchey (February 2021, Baen)
 "The Seven Nipples of Molly Kitchen", in The Chronicles of Davids edited by David Afsharirad (September 2019, Baen)
 "The Greatest Horse Thief in History", in Straight Outta Deadwood edited by David Boop (October 2019, Baen)
 "The Dead Who Care", in Parallel Worlds: The Heroes Within edited by L. J. Hachmeister and R.R. Virdi (October 2019, Source 7)
 "Thirsty Bones", in Twilight Tales edited by Jaleta Clegg and Joe Monson (February 2021, Hemelein Publications)
 "Upon the Bells of the Horses", in The Florilegium of Madness edited by Callie Butler and Joe Monson (July 2021, Hemelein Publications)
 "The Hearts of the Children", in The Florilegium of Madness edited by Callie Butler and Joe Monson (July 2021, Hemelein Publications)
 "The Lord Set a Mark", in And Then It Got Weird: An Anthology of Paranormal Peculiarities edited by Jamie Ibson (October 2021, Blood Moon Press)

Indrajit and Fix
 "The Path of the Hunter" in Negotiation edited by Kacey Ezell and Marisa Wolf (October 2019, Seventh Seal Press)
 "No Trade for Nice Guys" in When Valor Must Hold edited by Rob Howell and Chris Kennedy (February 2020, New Mythology Press)
 In the Palace of Shadow and Joy (July 2020, Baen)

Rock Band Fights Evil 
 Hellhound on My Trail (February 2015, WordFire Press)
Snake Handlin' Man (February 2015, WordFire Press)
 Crow Jane (February 2015, WordFire Press)
 Devil Sent the Rain (February 2015, WordFire Press)
 This World Is Not My Home (June 2016, WordFire Press)
 The Good Son (July 2016, WordFire Press)
 Earth Angel (July 2016, WordFire Press)

Two omnibuses collect the first six novels:

 Band on the Run (vol. 1–3, March 2016, WordFire Press)
 The Road to Hell (vols. 4–6, April 2017, WordFire Press)

The Witchy War 
Alternate history flintlock fantasy set in the early 1800s North America.
 "Dei Britannici", a prequel short story in Free Stories 2017 edited by (2017, Baen.com)

Witchy Eye trilogy
 Witchy Eye (March 2017, Baen)
 Witchy Winter (April 2018, Baen)
 Witchy Kingdom (August 2019, Baen)

Serpent Daughter trilogy
 Serpent Daughter (November 2020, Baen)

Other 
Press Forward Saints, Mormon steampunk anthology edited by Butler (March 2019, Immortal Works)
The Wilding Probate (October 2020, Immortal Works)
The Florilegium of Madness, collection of short fiction (July 2021, Hemelein Publications)
Abbott in Darkness (May 2022, Baen)
Time Trials with M. A. Rothman (forthcoming March 2023, Baen)

Critical reception
The writing in Time Trials, co-authored with M. A. Rothman, was described as "highly enjoyable" and "entertaining", having well-developed characters, and praised for "refreshingly [showing] respect for ancient civilizations and their accomplishments".

Awards and honors
Butler has received the following awards and honors:

References 

21st-century American novelists
American children's writers
American fantasy writers
American male novelists
Place of birth missing (living people)
American science fiction writers
Brigham Young University alumni
Latter Day Saints from Utah
Living people
New York University alumni
Novelists from Utah
Year of birth missing (living people)
21st-century American male writers
Harold B. Lee Library-related 21st century articles